Gregory Tifernas (Cortona, 1414 – Venice, 1462) was a Greek Renaissance humanist from the Italian city of Città di Castello (Tifernum in Latin, whence his surname).

Biography
He studied the Greek Classics under Manuel Chrysoloras and was the first teacher of Greek in France at the University of Paris. It appears that he only stayed a short time in Paris but it proved long enough to train several students who would carry on his work.

Works 
 Physica Theophrasti e greco in latinam ab Gregorio Tifernio – Latin translation of Theophrastus' Physica

See also 
French humanism
Greek scholars in the Renaissance

References 

14th-century Byzantine people
15th-century Byzantine people
Greek Renaissance humanists
People from Città di Castello
15th-century Greek educators